Christine Woods (born September 3, 1983) is an American actress who notably appeared in the HBO series Hello Ladies. She previously portrayed FBI Special Agent Janis Hawk in the ABC series FlashForward.

Early life
Woods was born in Lake Forest, California. She studied musical theater at the University of Arizona.

Career
Woods starred in Perfect Couples, a half-hour romantic comedy that premiered in 2010. It was not renewed for a second season. She played police officer Dawn Lerner, in a major storyline, on three episodes in season 5 (2014) of the series The Walking Dead.

Filmography

Film

Television

Awards and nominations

References

External links
 

21st-century American actresses
Living people
Actresses from California
Actresses from Lake Forest, California
University of Arizona alumni
American television actresses
1983 births